Poona is an impact crater in Chryse Planitia in the Lunae Palus quadrangle of Mars. It measures 19.87 kilometers in diameter and was named after the city of Pune, Maharashtra, India.

The ejecta have a marked radial pattern and no outer rampart.

References 

Lunae Palus quadrangle
Impact craters on Mars